Alocasia gageana, the dwarf upright elephant ear or dwarf taro, is a species of flowering plant in the family Araceae, native to the Kachin Hills of Myanmar. Reaching , it is only a dwarf when compared to the giant upright elephant ear Alocasia odora or to taro (Colocasia esculenta). It makes for a large houseplant, or an outdoor ornamental plant in tropical or (nearly) frost-free subtropical areas (USDA zone 9b or warmer).

With Alocasia odora it is a parent of the so-called Persian palm, Alocasia 'Calidora', which would be better called Alocasia × calidora.

References

gageana
House plants
Ornamental plants
Endemic flora of Myanmar
Plants described in 1920